Recombination signal binding protein for immunoglobulin kappa J region is a protein that in humans is encoded by the RBPJ gene.

RBPJ also known as CBF1, is the human homolog for the Drosophila gene Suppressor of Hairless. Its promoter region is classically used  to demonstrate Notch1 signaling.

Interactions 

RBPJ has been shown to interact with:
 NOTCH1 
 NCOR2, 
 PCAF, 
 SND1, 
 SNW1, and
SOX18.

References

Further reading

External links 
 

Transcription factors